FK Željezničar may refer to:
FK Željezničar Sarajevo
FK Željezničar Doboj

See also
FK Železničar (disambiguation)
NK Željezničar (disambiguation)
NK Železničar (disambiguation)